The Philippines men's national volleyball team represents Philippines in international volleyball competitions and friendly matches, governed by Philippine National Volleyball Federation since 2021.

History 
The national team played as early as the 1910s playing at the 1913 Far Eastern Championship Games where the first international volleyball competition was played.

Competition records

Asian Men's Volleyball Championship

Asian Games

Asian Games: Nine-a-side

Southeast Asian Games

Far Eastern Games

Team

Current squad 

The following persons were assigned by the Philippine National Volleyball Federation as part of the coaching staff.

Starting Rotation

Former squads

2009 Asian Men's Volleyball Championship

 Manila 2009 — 15th place
Clarence Esteban, Reny John Balse, Raffy Mosuela, Michael Cariño, Jeffrey Malabanan, Edjet Mabbayad, Edcer Penetrante, Dante Alinsunurin (c), Jessie Lopez, Chris Macasaet, Sylvester Honrade, Niño Jeruz
Head coach: Sinfronio Acaylar
Assistant coach: George Pascua

2019 Southeast Asian Games 

Coaching staff
 Head coach: Dante Alinsunurin
 Assistant coach(s): Ariel dela Cruz  Sherwin Meneses  Allen Fuentes

Team staff
 Team Manager:
 Team Utility:

Medical staff
 Team Physician:
 Physical Therapist/Trainer:

2017 Southeast Asian Games 

Coaching staff
 Head coach:   Sinfronio "Sammy" Acaylar
 Assistant coach(s):   Michael "Maki" Cariño
  Eddieson Orcullo
  Hertito Monzon
  Alvin "Bong" Dumalaog
  Sandy Rieta

Team Staff
 Team Manager:   Michael Santos
 Team Utility:   Alvin Tañada

Medical Staff
 Team Physician:   Gerardo Asia
 Physical Therapist:   Randel Siegfred Lapuz

2015 Southeast Asian Games 

Coaching staff
 Head coach:   Oliver Almadro
 Assistant coach(s):   Sherwin Malonzo   Ernesto Pamilar

Team Staff
 Team Manager:
 Team Utility: 

Medical Staff
 Team Physician:
 Physical Therapist:

Youth team

Previous squads 

2015 Asian U23 Men's Volleyball Championship

Coaching staff
 Head coach:  Oliver Almadro
 Assistant coach(s):  Jarod Hubalde Timothy Sto. Tomas

Team Staff
 Team Manager:  Andre Pareja
 Team Utility: 

Medical Staff
 Team Physician:
 Physical Therapist:  Bethel Solano

Results

Asian Youth Boys Volleyball Championship

Asian Men's U20 Volleyball Championship

Asian Men's U23 Volleyball Championship

Coaches 

 Sinfronio "Sammy" Acaylar (1991)
 Song Yung Ho (2003–?)
 Francis Vicente
 Sinfronio "Sammy" Acaylar (2009)
 Oliver Almadro  (2015–2016)
 Sinfronio "Sammy" Acaylar (2017–2019)
 Dante Alinsunurin (2019–2022)
 Odjie Mamon (2023)
 Sérgio Veloso (2023–)

See also 
 Philippines women's national volleyball team
 Philippines national volleyball teams in FIVB club tournaments
 Philippines men's national beach volleyball team
 Philippines women's national beach volleyball team
 PLDT HOME TVolution team
 Spikers' Turf
 Volleyball in the Philippines

References 

Volleyball
Volleyball in the Philippines
National men's volleyball teams
Men's volleyball teams in the Philippines